Jessica Houston (born November 18, 1989 in Boston, Massachusetts) is an American figure skater. She is a two season competition on the Junior Grand Prix, winning bronze medals at the 2004 events in Courchevel and Miercurea Ciuc. She won the Triglav Trophy in 2003 on the novice level. She has been coached by Mark Mitchell and Peter Johansson and represents the Skating Club of Boston. She placed 11th at the junior level at the 2006 United States Figure Skating Championships, but failed to make it out of Eastern Sectionals on the senior level in the 2006/2007 season.

Results

 N = Novice level

References

External links
 
 Unseen Skaters bio

American female single skaters
1989 births
Living people
Figure skaters from Boston
21st-century American women